The Dooley's Ferry Fortifications Historic District encompasses a series of military earthworks erected in southwestern Arkansas, along the Red River in Hempstead County.  They were constructed in late 1864 by Confederate troops under orders from Major-General John B. Magruder as a defense against the potential movements of Union Army forces toward Shreveport, Louisiana.  They command a formerly major road intersection just east of Dooley's Ferry, one of the most important regional crossings of the Red River.  After the war a cemetery for African-Americans (known as the Dooley Hill Cemetery) was established adjacent to one of the gun emplacements.

The fortifications were listed on the National Register of Historic Places in 2004.

Gallery

See also
National Register of Historic Places listings in Hempstead County, Arkansas

References

Further reading

American Civil War sites
Historic districts on the National Register of Historic Places in Arkansas
National Register of Historic Places in Hempstead County, Arkansas